Synechodes rotanicola is a moth in the family Brachodidae. It was described by Kallies in 2004. It is found on Java in Indonesia.

The wingspan is 26 mm for males and 34 mm for females. The forewings are black, subbasally, in the middle part and in the distal portion with scales with whitish-grey tips. There are a number of patches of scattered blood-red scales. The hindwings are black, with a yellow subbasal band, divided by narrow black streaks along the veins.

Etymology
The species name refers to the possible host plant and is derived from the Indonesian word rotan (the rotang palm in the genus Calamus).

References

Natural History Museum Lepidoptera generic names catalog

Brachodidae
Moths described in 2004